Elizabeth Tailboys may refer to:

 Elizabeth Blount, married name Elizabeth Tailboys, Henry VIII's mistress
Elizabeth Tailboys, 4th Baroness Tailboys of Kyme